Zimmer is German surname meaning "room" or "chamber". Derivative names include Zimmermann (Zimmerman), the occupational surname meaning Carpenter, literally translated "room man" (i.e. someone who builds wooden structures to be lived in).

List of people with this surname

Sciences
 Andreas Zimmer, German neurobiologist
 Carl Zimmer, popular science writer specializing in evolution
 Carl Wilhelm Erich Zimmer, German zoologist
 John Todd Zimmer (1889-1957), American ornithologist
 Karl Zimmer, German physicist and radiation biologist
 Louis Zimmer, Belgian clockmaker and astronomer

Sports
 Adam Zimmer (1984–2022), American football coach
 Andy Zimmer, American basketball player
 Bradley Zimmer, American baseball player
 Chief Zimmer (Charles Louis Zimmer, 1860–1949), catcher in Major League Baseball
 Cyril Zimmer, Australian rules footballer
 Don Zimmer, Major League Baseball manager and coach
 Kyle Zimmer, American baseball player
 Mike Zimmer, head coach for the Minnesota Vikings of the NFL
 Sabine Zimmer, German race walker
 Tom Zimmer, (born 1952), American baseball player, coach and manager

Politics
 Dawn Zimmer, mayor of Hoboken, New Jersey
 Dick Zimmer, American politician
 Gabi Zimmer, German politician
 J. Eugene Zimmer (1912–1995), New York assemblyman
 Matthias Zimmer (born 1961), German politician
 Rod Zimmer (1942–2016), Canadian senator

Acting
 Constance Zimmer, American actress
 Kim Zimmer, American actress
 Laurie Zimmer, former American actress

Music
 Hans Zimmer, German composer, best known for film scores
 Heinrich Zimmer (Celticist) (1851–1910), German celticist
 Joana Zimmer, German pop music singer
 Norma Zimmer, American vocalist

Other
 Art Zimmer, automobile executive, re-founder of Zimmer (automobile)
 Ben Zimmer, American linguist and lexicographer
 Emma Zimmer, overseer at the Ravensbrück concentration camp executed for war crimes
 George Zimmer, founder and CEO of the Men's Wearhouse
 Hans-Peter Zimmer, German painter and sculptor
 Heinrich Zimmer (1890–1943), German indologist
 John Zimmer, co-founder of rideshare program Zimride
 Marion Zimmer Bradley, American author of fantasy novels
 Michael Zimmer, a privacy and social media scholar
 Nathan Löb David Zimmer, English Kabbalist
 Patrick Benedict Zimmer, Catholic philosopher and theologian
 Richard Zimmer (general) (1893–1971), German military officer
 Robert Zimmer, former provost of Brown University, mathematician, and current president of the University of Chicago
 Robert Zimmer (philosopher), German philosopher and essayist

Multiple people
 Paul Zimmer (disambiguation), several people
 David Zimmer (disambiguation), several people

Fictional characters
 Anthony Zimmer, fictional character
 David Zimmer, main character in The Book of Illusions
 Leila Kwan Zimmer, a character in the Netflix series Grand Army
 Doctor Zimmer, a fictional character from the 2008 console game Fallout 3

See also
 Zimmer (disambiguation)

German-language surnames